The Tiniwan languages are two extinct and one moribund language of Colombia that form a small family.

Jolkesky (2016) also notes that there are lexical similarities with Andaqui.

Languages
The Tiniwan languages are:
 Tinigua (Tiniwa) 
 Pamigua (Pamiwa) †
 Majigua †

Nothing is known about Majigua (Campbell 2012). It was once spoken on the Ariari River in the Meta region of Colombia.

Classification
Though data on Pamigua is extremely limited, the relationship seems to be fairly close: Tinigua manaxaí 'walk!', Pamigua menáxa 'let's go!'.

Loukotka (1968) lists the following basic vocabulary items for Tinigua and Pamigua.

References

 
Language families